Francisco Javier de la Rosa (born 1947) is a Spanish lawyer and businessman.

De la Rosa was the head of the Spanish conglomerate called Grupo Torras during the six years from 1986 to 1992, when the London-based Kuwait Investment Office (KIO) invested $5 billion in Torras. KIO state that as much as $1 billion was stolen, and much of the rest "squandered through egregious mismanagement".

De la Rosa's name has appeared in the leaked Panama Papers.

References

1947 births
Living people
Spanish businesspeople
20th-century Spanish lawyers
People named in the Panama Papers